Jahangir Forouhar (May 24, 1916 – November 6, 1997) was an Iranian actor.

Biography 
Forouhar was born in 1916 in the city of Isfahan. His father was Mustafa Khan Davam al-Saltanah. His grandfather was Mirza Mohammad Ali Khan Ghavam al-Dawlah and he was descendant of Mirza Abbas Khan Ghavam al-Dawlah.  

He was father of Iranian entertainer Leila Forouhar.Jahangir Forouhar, 

He started in theater at the age 18. He started acting in cinemas in 1945 with the film Ganjineh Soleiman. After the revolution, he was summoned to the courts of the Islamic Revolutionary Court. In 1970, he received a commendation for the second role of a man for the film House of Solitude (Mehdi Sabbaghzadeh) from the 10th Fajr Film Festival.

Filmography 
 Dash Akol (1971)
 The suitor (1972)
 Sattar Khan (1972)
 Mozaffar (1974)
 Soltan-e Sahebgharan (1974, TV series)
 The Ghost Valley's Treasure Mysteries (1974)
 The Falconet (1975)
 My Uncle Napoleon (1976, TV series)
 Dar Emtedade Shab (1978)
 Desiderium (1978)
 Hezar Dastan (1987, TV series)
 Shaheed-e-Kufa (1992–1998, TV series)

References

External links

 Photograph of Jahangir Forouhar: 
 Photograph of Jahangir Forouhar's grave:

1916 births
1997 deaths
Actors from Isfahan
People from Isfahan
People from Tehran
Iranian male film actors
Iranian male television actors
20th-century Iranian male actors
Burials at artist's block of Behesht-e Zahra